Edwin M. Rumill (September 28, 1910 – September 15, 1987) was a prominent sportswriter in the Boston area for approximately 40 years. A member of the Baseball Writers' Association of America, he wrote articles and editorials for The Christian Science Monitor from 1932 until his retirement in 1972. Rumill covered the Boston Red Sox and Boston Braves. His photograph can be seen in the Boston Red Sox version of the official 1946 World Series Program.

References 

Sportswriters from Massachusetts
1910 births
1987 deaths
Writers from Boston
Sports in Boston
20th-century American non-fiction writers